Berberentulus is a genus of proturans in the family Acerentomidae.

Species
 Berberentulus berberus (Condé, 1948)
 Berberentulus buchi Tuxen & Imadaté, 1975
 Berberentulus capensis (Womersley, 1931)
 Berberentulus huetheri Nosek, 1973
 Berberentulus huisunensis Chao & Chen, 1999
 Berberentulus neipuensis Chao & Chen, 1999
 Berberentulus nelsoni Tuxen, 1976
 Berberentulus polonicus Szeptycki, 1968
 Berberentulus rennelensis Tuxen & Imadaté, 1975
 Berberentulus tannae Tuxen, 1977
 Berberentulus travassosi (Silvestri, 1938)

References

Protura